Gamechanger Films is an American company that finances independent films directed by women.

History 
Gamechanger Films was founded in 2013 by Julie Parker Benello, Dan Cogan, Geralyn Dreyfous, Wendy Ettinger.  Mynette Louie was the President, Derek Nguyen was the Director of Operations & Creative Affairs, and Mary Jane Skalski is the senior adviser.  Louie and Nguyen departed to start their own company, The Population, in 2019. Brenda Robinson is a new partner in Gamechanger Films 2.0, which is led by Effie T. Brown.

Films funded must be directed or co-directed by a woman, but they may be of any genre.  Films do not need to be focused on females or female-centric topics.  They support films of a budget of $2 million or less.  Funding was raised by Chicken & Egg Pictures and Impact Partners and comes from equity investors.  Gamechanger Films is for-profit.  Louie said that their goal "is to finance films that are critically and commercially viable".  As a result of this, they do not fund experimental non-narrative films.  In 2014, they established a $2500 grant for female directors who screen their films at South by Southwest.

Films financed 
 Land Ho!
 The Invitation
 Addicted to Fresno
 Lovesong
 Buster's Mal Heart
 The Strange Ones
 Hunting Season (Temporada de Caza)
 The Long Dumb Road
 The Tale
 Nancy
 Passing

References

External links 
 

Film production companies of the United States
Entertainment companies established in 2013
2013 establishments in New York (state)